State Road 97 (SR 97) is a south-north two-lane highway entirely in Escambia County, Florida. It runs from County Road 95A, just southeast of U.S. Highway 29 in Molino, to the Alabama state line near Atmore, where it becomes State Route 21.  The road runs through the community of Walnut Hill and serves primarily to connect Pensacola to the northwest Escambia County and Atmore areas.  In combination with SR 21, the road also provides a connection to Interstate 65.

Route description

SR 97 heads northwest from its southern terminus at County Road 95A, just east of passing under U.S. Highway 29/SR 95, in Molino. The road heads northwest through rural Escambia County and slowly turns into a northerly direction as it approaches Walnut Hill, north of which it is also known as Atmore Highway.  Heading directly north from Walnut Hill, the road meets its northern terminus south of Atmore at the Alabama state line, where it becomes State Route 21. SR 97 intersects with several county roads, but does not meet with other state roads or US highways.

The Florida Department of Transportation annual average daily traffic (AADT) numbers for 2012 show average numbers between 5,600 vehicles on the southern portion of the road, decreasing to 4,300 vehicles around Walnut Hill, and again increasing to 5,000 north of Walnut Hill, back to 5,600 vehicles at the road's northern terminus.

History
A 1922 map of Florida auto trails shows an unimproved auto trail running from Quintette, south of Molino, through what appears to be the Walnut Hill area, and then to Atmore.  It appears that the portion of today's SR 97 from Walnut Hill (starting around mile 15) to its northern terminus corresponds to this 1922 auto trail.  The southern portion also appears on this map, but is indicated as an unimportant road.

In 1935, the current routing of SR 97, from Molino northwest to Walnut Hill, then north to Atmore, was extant as a third-class graded road, and was signed as SR 87 at the time.

By 1955, SR 4 is being shown as a bituminous road, with its start at the intersection with US 29/SR 95 (now CR 95A) west of Molino, and traveling its current routing to Atmore.  The road intersected what were then SR 99 and SR 380 (now both CR 99) around Walnut Hill, and SR 4 (now CR 4) south of the Alabama state line.

On maps from 1978, the entire road had been paved in hard surface.  The state roads it had intersected in 1955 had all been re-signed as county roads, bringing SR 97 to its current form.

Major intersections

See also

 List of state highways in Florida

References

External links

097
097